

Standings

Philippines vs Singapore
Singapore's anticipated first game of the tournament saw the host dominate but waste numerous good chances, many of which were straight at Filipino goalkeeper Jun Badelic, who had a good game. In the 31st minute they had the ball in the back of the net following a free-kick but it was called off as Shakir Hamzah was adjudged to have impeded Badelic in the process. Singapore were unlucky again six minutes later as Sahil Suhaimi was through on goal but his effort rebounded off the post with the slightest of touches from Bedelic. The Philippines had a few chances, mostly created by their tricky wingers Bugas and Salenga. In the fifteenth minute the former's cross found captain Gerardo Valmayor, but despite being completely unmarked he could not direct his header on target. On the stroke of half-time Singapore finally made their dominance pay off through another free-kick as Faris Ramli's fine cross was met by the head of unmarked Sheikh Abdul Hadi's whose effort was beyond the reach of the goalkeeper and the defenders on the line. After Santos of the Philippines missed a good chance Singapore missed an even better one in the 64th minute, after some great passing Sahil was again right in front of goal unmarked but somehow managed to drag his effort horribly wide. The match was very physical and at time was marred by some overzealous challenges, mostly from the Filipino players, although some of the Singaporean players were not innocent either. In one particular incident in the 82nd minute Kennedy Uzoka unintentionally bundled Shakir over, only for the latter to kick out. Uzoka responded by stepping over Shakir to argue with him at with the Singaporean defender pretended to be hit in the face. Uzoka received a yellow card although some analysers thought both players should have been sent off.

Myanmar vs Indonesia
Myanmar opened the scoring in this encounter in the 21st minute; Kaung Sat Naing lost the ball in the box then it fell kindly to Shine Thura who slotted the ball for the opening goal. They would double their lead seventeen minutes later, as Indonesian goaltender Muhammad Natshir found Nay Lin Tun's free-kick too powerful to handle and palmed it right to Sithu Aung who headed in from barely a yard out. Indonesia created very few chances despite equal amounts of ball possession but nonetheless pulled a goal back just seconds before the half-time whistle as Abduh Lestaluhu audacious effort from an acute angle found the back of the net via the underside of the crossbar. The goal did little to dampen the Burmese who scored nine minutes after the restart as Hansamu Yama lost the ball to Sithu right outside the penalty box and the latter chipped Natshir who was off the goal-line for his second of the match and his team's third. Myanmar would then further extend their lead in the 64th minute in similar circumstances to their first as the Indonesian defence once again could deal with Nay's free-kick and the ball fell right to Kyaw Zin Lwin who scored. With six minutes later and twenty to go Indonesia took advantage of some slack Burmese marking as Ahmad Noviandani got away from the defender to slot the ball at the goalkeepers near post. That would be the end of the scoring in an opening and entertaining game.

Cambodia vs Philippines
Cambodia opened the scoring in the 30 minute, a sliding challenge from a Filipino defender took the ball away from Keo Sokpheng, but it fell right to Prak Mony Udom, and the Cambodian captain unleashed a powerful shot through the goalkeeper's near post. Four minutes later the Cambodian league was doubled as Tith Dina did well to let Sos Suhana's pass go by and it came tight to Sokpheng, his initial shot was cleared off the line by Ronnie Aguisanda, but Sokpheng was on hand to smash the ball home at the second time of asking. Seven minutes into the second half though the Philippines pulled one back as Kennedy Uzoka did well to muscle off the defender marking him and crossed the ball for Paolo Salenga who got away from his man marker to slot the ball in. There was some controversy in the 65th minute as Ngoy Srin had a goal wrongly disallowed for offsides, but nine minutes from time Cambodia did restore their two-goal lead with Chan Vathanaka calmly slotting home. The match ended on a sour note as frustration showed for Arnel Amita who revived a second yellow card for kicking the ball away after he had committed a foul.

Singapore vs Myanmar
Myanmar started strongly and pegged Singapore back with their high pressing game. In the 24th minute Zon Moe Aung's free-kick found his captain Nay Lin Tun completely unmarked who bundled the ball in from close range to open the scoring. Singapore would equalise only ten minutes later though as Phyo Ko Ko Thein was adjudged to have handled the ball in the box. Faris Ramli was given the responsibility of taking the penalty kick and made no mistake, even though Burmese goalkeeper Kyaw Zin Phyo dived the right way he could get no where near Faris' shot. Two minutes later Adam Swandi got away from his defender but despite being unmarked Stanely Ng could not connect with his cross. Although Singapore would boss the game from then on in possession and chances it was Myanmar who would get the game winner as on the hour mark Ye Ko Oo's long range free-kick was well struck, although Singaporean goalkeeper Syazwan Buhari seemed to be fooled by an awkward bounce the ball took. Singaporean substitute Irfan Fandi  did score in the 77th minute but it was disallowed for a foul by Irfan on the Burmese goaltender in the buildup. Once again Singaporean star forward Sahil Suhaimi had a poor game, missing many clear-cut chances. Myanmar held on to record a second straight win.

Indonesia vs Cambodia
Indonesia opened the scoring in the 12th minute as Adam Alis Setyano was converted by Muchlis Hadi. They would then double their advantage as Ahmad Noviandani latched onto a long pass seven minutes before the break and powered a shot past the Cambodian goalkeeper who was hesitant to come off his line. Cambodia would pull one back as Syaiful Cahya's heavy challenge on Ngoy Srin resulted in a penalty kick which his captain Prak Mony Udom made no mistake to score from. Cambodia dominated for a few moments but it was Indonesia who scored the next goal in the 68th minute as Muchilis took advantage of some lax defending, and he would grab his hat-trick six minutes later as Evan Dimas' powerful shot from outside the area rebounded off the post but fell perfectly for Muchilis who only had to head the ball into the unguarded net. Indonesia were not done there as five minutes from time Muchilis and substitute Wawan Febrianto exchanged some neat passes with the latter scoring, and then in stoppage time Febrianto passed for Evan who scored himself to complete the 5–1 win.

Philippines vs Myanmar
Myanmar secured their progression out of the group while at the same time eliminating the Philippines from any advancement in a free scoring win, although it was the latter who opened the scoring. In the early stages Shine Thura missed the target when one-on-one with the goalkeeper before Filipino captain Shirmar Felongco won possession in the middle of the field and surged forward and unleashed a precise shot from outside the area that gave the Philippines the lead. It was Myanmar's own captain Nay Lin Tun who would get the equaliser as his free-kick found the back of the net just four minutes later although it did take a significant deflection off of a Filipino defender. The Burmese continued to dominate the remainder of the game, and although they missed many good chances in the first half they would take the lead just seconds after the restart as Shine picked up Nay Lin's through ball to score at the near post. In the 62nd minute Ye Win Aung took advantage of some poor defending to tap in Hlaing Bo Bo's corner into an unguarded net, and another Filipino mistake led to another Burmese goal seven minutes later as Nathanael Villanueva completely misjudged Ye Ko Oo's pass allowing Sithu Aung to slot into an empty goal. Myanmar would grab a filth in stoppage time as Kyaw Zin Lwin rifled Kaung Sat Naing's pass into the top corner.

Cambodia vs Singapore
Cambodia dominated the opening stages of the game and created many good opportunities. They probably should have had a penalty too in the 30th minute when Prak Mony Udom was tripped by Shakir Hamzah in the box, but the referee waved play on. Singapore scored twice in the dying moments of the half though as first Safirul Sulaiman curled in a great free-kick in the 44th minute after Sahil Suhaimi was fouled just outside the box, and a minute later Irfan Fandi chipped the ball over the advancing goalkeeper allowing Faris Ramli to head into an empty goal. Cambodia would pull one back as Chhin Chhoeun showed some quick feet to make room as he crossed the ball for the unmarked Chan Vathanaka who headed in. The match turned physical and 9 yellow cards were shown as both teams went for the win, but it was Singapore who got the final goal, as in the dying moments as from a swift counterattack the ball was booted upfield to send Sahil Suhaimi one-on-one with Um Sereyroth, and the Singaporean forward confidently slotted past the Cambodian goaltender to score his first goal of the tournament.

Indonesia vs Philippines
Already eliminated and playing in what was their last game at the 2015 Southeast Asian games the Philippines gave a much improved performance although they often lacked the finishing touch. Indonesian star Evan Dimas, playing as captain for the night, capitalized on the first chance of the game in only the fourth minute as he latched on to a long pass and lobbed the ball over Jun Badelic and the defender on the line from an acute angle to give Indonesia the lead. Indonesia wasn't finished as 9 minutes later Paulo Sitanggang's excellent dribble and cutback found Evan again who smashed the ball in for his and his team's second. Philippines had an excellent chance to pull one back in the 43rd minute as Daniel Gadia's through ball found Gerardo Valmayor completely unmarked but the Filipino striker could only muster a tame shot straight at goalie Teguh. A scramble in the box in the 50th minute resulted in Julian Clarino having to clear off the line. That was the last serious chance of the game as both teams slowed the tempo and resorted to off-target shooting from long range, Paolo Salenga scuffing a headed attempt in the first minute of injury time.

Myanmar vs Cambodia
Myanmar came into this match already assured to move on, and only needed a point to claim top spot. Cambodia, on the other hand, had to win by a massive margin and hope other results went their way to have any chance of progressing. That slim chance was boosted in the 26th minute as Tith Dina's corner had to be parried away by stand-in goaltender Aung Wai Phyo. but it came straight back to Keo Sokpheng who blasted in from close range. In first-half stoppage time Chan Vathanaka was fouled by Phyo Ko Ko Thein resulting in a penalty kick. Vathanaka was given the responsibility, but Aung dived to his right to save the shot, however in his despair to claim the rebound he ended up fouling Vathanaka again and much to the shock of the Burmese the referee awarded another penalty-kick. Undeterred Vathanaka took the kick again, and even though both he and goalkeeper went the same way as before his shot was out of Aung's reach. Myanmar would pull one back in the 55th minute as from a short corner combination Thiha Zaw got in front of his defender to bundle in. Just two minutes later, however, Sokpheng scored his second as he headed in Vathanaka's cross to restore Cambodia's two-goal lead. A minute from time Hlaing Bo Bo's clever pass found fellow substitute Kaung Sat Naing who shot past goalkeeper Um Sereyroth, and then in stoppage time it was Kaung's turn to go from scorer to provider as his ball across the face of goal was met by yet another substitute Sithu Aung who scored easily to tie the game and assure Myanmar would finish top of the group.

Singapore vs Indonesia
The situation of this match was simple: the winner of this match would go through to the knockout stage, although Indonesia could afford a draw with their superior goal differential coming in. The importance of the match was clearly evident as even early on both teams played determined but also physical, within the first ten minutes three yellow cards had already been issued. In the 28th minute Paulo Sitanggang's cross caught Singaporean goalkeeper Syazwan Buhari out of possession but Evan Dimas failed to control the ball. Evan had been identified by most observers as the Indonesian danger man, and ten minutes later his neat one-two with Ahmad Noviandani and the latter's strong shot forcing Syazwan into a save at his near post. Needing to win the game Aide Iskandar made an attacking substitution at half-time with Irfan Fandi and Faris Ramli coming on. It was Indonesia though that took the lead barely two minutes after the break as Muchlis Hadi's run and cross was missed by a couple Singaporean and Indonesian players but fell right to Evan outside the box, and his shot was perfectly placed in the top corner leaving Syazwan grounded. Singapore had the perfect change to equalise just seconds later as Faris's cross was right to the totally unmarked Sahil Suhaimi yet the forward's header was straight at Teguh Amiruddin. Adam Alis Setyano's long range shooting troubled Singapore all night, and they had several good chances to double their lead latter in the second half as Syazwan had  to dive to keep out Syaiful Cahya's free-kick, and then the Singaporean goalkeeper frustrated Indonesia again after Noviandani's effort at the far post was tipped around for a corner after Sitanggang's excellent defence-splitting pass. Whatever slim hopes Singapore had of winning the match became even slimmer as defender Ho Wai Loon was sent off for a second bookable offence as his late challenge from behind on Evan earned him a second yellow card and subsequent red. Despite their man advantage Indonesia actually sat back a bit, Anumanthan Kumar and Pravin Gunasagaran had dangerous long range shots but their opponents hung on comfortably for the win as Singorean players clearly were  frustrated, four of them were cautioned in the last twenty minutes. Immediately after the game Aide Iskandar resigned after the host's rather disappointing tournament.

References

Group A